Daniella Jeffry-Pilot (1941 - 2019) was a writer, teacher and historian from Saint Martin, who was the founder of the United Saint-Martin Movement. She was awarded the Ordre des Palmes Académiques by the French government for her activism.

Biography 
Jeffry-Pilot was born in 1941 in Marigot and went to school at the Lycée Gerville-Réache in Basse-Terre in Guadeloupe. She graduated in 1965 from the University of Paris-La Sorbonne with a BA in English and in 1971 she graduated from the University of Antananarivo in Madagascar, with a Higher Certificate in Education and returned to Saint Martin. From 1974 she taught English and French at the Collège of Marigot. She also translated the works of archaeologist Jay Haviser and writer George Lamming to French.

In 1988 she founded the United Saint-Martin Movement, which campaigns for the political unification of the island. In 1990 she was appointed President of the Saint-Martin People's Consensus by Albert Fleming. She retired from the Collège of Marigot in 2000. From 2001 to 2007 she was a member of the Territorial Council. She died in 2019.

Awards 

 Ordre des Palmes Académiques

Selected works 

 1963 – A Landmark Year in St. Martin (Xlibris, 2011)
 Saint-Martin : stabilisation sociétale dans dans la Caraïbe francaise (L'Harmattan, 2010)

References 

1941 births
2019 deaths
French women historians
Saint Martinois educators
Saint Martinois women in politics